Jealous Me Was Killed By Curiosity is the second and final studio album by Moros Eros. It was released on October 16, 2007 by Victory Records.

Track listing
"Quit, You're Being Thoughtless" - 3:07
"On My Side" - 4:16
"Chokes" - 3:08
"Wake and Wait" - 4:54
"Safety Net" - 3:44
"Old Friend" - 4:58
"Lows and Highs" - 4:14
"Pride and Joy" - 3:14
"The View From Below" - 6:11

Singles
"Safety Net"
"On My Side"

References

External links
 Official Site
 Moros Eros' MySpace

2007 albums
Moros Eros albums
Victory Records albums